The Rotterdam Half Marathon was an annual half marathon race over 21.1 kilometres, that was staged in Rotterdam, the Netherlands on the second Sunday in September. The event was contested from 2004 to 2009. It was discontinued in 2010 due to lacking participation.

In 2022, the race returned co-inciding with the World Police and Fire Games that were held in Rotterdam that year. The municipality of Rotterdam did not grant an event permit for an edition in 2023.

Winners

See also
 Rotterdam Marathon
 Egmond Half Marathon

References

External links
 Official website
 2007 article from IAAF

Half marathons in the Netherlands
Sports competitions in Rotterdam
Recurring sporting events established in 2004
Recurring sporting events disestablished in 2009
2004 establishments in the Netherlands
2009 disestablishments in the Netherlands